In linear algebra, a standard symplectic basis is a basis  of a symplectic vector space, which is a vector space with a nondegenerate alternating bilinear form , such that . A symplectic basis of a symplectic vector space always exists; it can be constructed by a procedure similar to the Gram–Schmidt process. The existence of the basis implies in particular that the dimension of a symplectic vector space is even if it is finite.

See also 
Darboux theorem
Symplectic frame bundle
Symplectic spinor bundle
Symplectic vector space

Notes

References 
da Silva, A.C., Lectures on Symplectic Geometry, Springer (2001). .
Maurice de Gosson: Symplectic Geometry and Quantum Mechanics (2006) Birkhäuser Verlag, Basel .

Symplectic geometry